Eat It is the sixth album by English rock band Humble Pie, released in April 1973 through A&M Records. Released as a double album, it peaked at number 13 on the US Billboard 200, number 34 in the UK Albums Chart, and number 9 in Australia.

Background
Steve Marriott had been talking to the group about having backing singers from early on. During the recording of Eat It, he had been in touch with Venetta Fields and asked her to find two other women to help her out. Fields chose Clydie King and Sherlie Matthews (both previously with Raeletts) to become the Blackberries and flew to London. When Marriott asked them to perform on tour with Humble Pie, Sherlie Matthews declined due to other commitments, including her two children and her husband. Matthews chose Billie Barnum to be missing member of the Blackberries.

Each side of this double album is different: side 1 features Steve Marriott penned rock and roll; side 2 has classic R&B covers; side 3 is a collection of acoustic Steve Marriott songs; side 4 features Humble Pie live in concert at Green's Playhouse in Glasgow, Scotland.

Eat It was the band's seventh official album release and their fifth for A&M Records. [This was also their third double LP (two-record set) within 18 months, the other two being 1971's Performance Rockin' The Fillmore and the late 1972 A&M compilation - Lost & Found.]

Marriott produced the album and it was the first album recorded in Marriott's newly built home recording studio Clear Sounds, in a converted barn at Beehive Cottage, Moreton, Essex.

Track listing

Side one
"Get Down to It" (Marriott) – 3:25
"Good Booze and Bad Women" (Marriott) – 3:11
"Is It for Love?" (Marriott) – 4:39 
"Drugstore Cowboy" (Marriott) – 5:35

Side two
"Black Coffee" (Ike Turner, Tina Turner) – 3:09
"I Believe to My Soul" (Ray Charles) – 4:03
"Shut up and Don't Interrupt Me" (Johnny Bristol, Edwin Starr) – 2:58
"That's How Strong My Love Is" (Roosevelt Jamison) – 3:44

Side three
"Say No More" (Marriott) – 1:58
"Oh, Bella (All That's Hers)" (Marriott) – 3:25
"Summer Song" (Marriott) – 2:42
"Beckton Dumps" (Marriott) – 3:13

Side four
 "Up Our Sleeve" (Humble Pie, lyrics by Steve Marriott) – 4:57
"Honky Tonk Women" (Keith Richards, Mick Jagger) – 4:03 
"Road Runner" (Eddie Holland, Lamont Dozier, Brian Holland) – 13:28

Personnel
Humble Pie
Steve Marriott - guitars, harmonica, keyboards, remixing, vocals
Dave "Clem" Clempson - guitars, backing vocals
Greg Ridley - bass, backing vocals
Jerry Shirley - drums

The Blackberries:
Billie Barnum - vocals
Clydie King - vocals
Venetta Fields - vocals

Guests:
B.J. Cole -  pedal steel guitar
Sidney George - saxophone

Album production:
Chris & Irish - Engineer
Fin Costello - Inside photo, photography
Michael Doud - Art direction
John Kosh - Cover design, preparation
Jim McCrary - Photography

Releases
1973 LP A&M 	   Cat.#3701
1973 LP A&M 	   Cat.#3701 (2)
1999 CD Import    Cat.#10593
1973 	 A&M 	   Cat.#1889
2006 CD Universal Cat.#6231  Japan
2007 CD Universal Cat.#93223         
2007 CD Universal Cat.#93223 Japan
2017 LP Box Disc 5 A&M ('The A&M Vinyl Boxset 1970-1975', released on 16 June 2017)

References

External links
Eat It on YouTube

1973 albums
Humble Pie (band) albums
Albums produced by Steve Marriott
A&M Records albums
Albums recorded in a home studio